This is a list of cities and towns in Central America that have, or once had, town tramway (urban tramway, or streetcar) systems as part of their public transport system.

Costa Rica

El Salvador

Guatemala

Honduras

Nicaragua

Panama

See also 

 List of town tramway systems in Africa
 List of town tramway systems in Asia
 List of town tramway systems in Europe
 List of town tramway systems in North America
 List of town tramway systems in Oceania
 List of town tramway systems in South America
 List of town tramway systems
 List of tram and light rail transit systems
 List of metro systems
 List of trolleybus systems

References

Inline citations

Bibliography
Books, Periodicals and External Links

Town
 
Tram transport-related lists